Yingchun Road is a station that serves Line 18 of the Shanghai Metro. Located at the intersection of Jinxiu Road and Minsheng Road in Pudong, Shanghai, the station was opened with the rest of phase one of Line 18 on December 30, 2021. The station is named after the nearby Yingchun Road, which intersects Minsheng Road one block north of the station.

References 

Railway stations in Shanghai
Shanghai Metro stations in Pudong
Line 18, Shanghai Metro
Railway stations in China opened in 2021